Christian Torberg Hegge (1743–1818) was a Norwegian civil servant and politician.  He served as the County Governor of Nordland county from 1789 until his retirement in 1811.

References

1743 births
1818 deaths
County governors of Norway
County governors of Nordland